Yatala may refer to any of the following items. For all Australian places named Yatala, the etymology at Hundred of Yatala applies.

Place names

Australia

Queensland 

 Yatala, Queensland, a suburb of the Gold Coast

South Australia 
River Torrens in Adelaide, initially known by European explorers as the Yatala; old name for land beside the river, especially to the north, from which several local names derive:
Hundred of Yatala, a cadastral hundred in Adelaide, 
District Council of Yatala a historic local government area
District Council of Yatala South a historic local government area
District Council of Yatala North a historic local government area
Yatala Labour Prison, a prison in Adelaide
Yatala Vale, South Australia, a suburb of Adelaid
Electoral district of Yatala, historic electorate
Yatala, a former suburb in the Corporate Town of Port Adelaide now in Rosewater, South Australia
Yatala Harbor, a bay in Spencer Gulf,
Yatala Harbour Upper Spencer Gulf Aquatic Reserve, a protected area
 a misspelling of Yalata (disambiguation)

Sri Lanka
 Yatala Vehera, an ancient Buddhist stupa in Tissamaharama, Sri Lanka

Other
 Yatala (clipper ship) a sailing ship running between England and South Australia
 Yatala (harvestman), an Arachnid genus

See als0
 List of ships named Yatala